Conuber is a genus of predatory sea snails, marine gastropod mollusks in the family Naticidae, the moon snails.

Species

Species within the genus Conuber include:
 Conuber conicum (Lamarck, 1822) - Conical Moon Snail.
 Conuber incei (Philippi, 1835)
 Conuber melastoma (Swainson, 1821)
 Conuber sordidum (Swainson, 1821)

References

Further reading 
 Torigoe K. & Inaba A. (2011). Revision on the classification of Recent Naticidae. Bulletin of the Nishinomiya Shell Museum. 7: 133 + 15 pp., 4 pls.

External links
Video of Conuber sordidus hunting Mictyris longicarpus on YouTube 

Naticidae
Taxa named by Harold John Finlay